Joshua Lockwood Logan III (October 5, 1908 – July 12, 1988) was an American director, writer, and actor. He shared a Pulitzer Prize for co-writing the musical South Pacific and was involved in writing other musicals.

Early years

Logan was born in Texarkana, Texas, the son of Susan (née Nabors) and Joshua Lockwood Logan. When he was three years old, his father committed suicide. Logan, his mother, and his younger sister, Mary Lee, then moved to his maternal grandparents' home in Mansfield, Louisiana, which Logan used 40 years later as the setting for his play The Wisteria Trees. Logan's mother remarried six years after his father's death and he then attended Culver Military Academy in Culver, Indiana, where his stepfather served on the staff as a teacher. At school, he experienced his first drama class and felt at home. After his high school graduation he attended Princeton University. At Princeton, he was involved with the intercollegiate summer stock company, known as the University Players, with fellow student James Stewart and also non-students Henry Fonda and Margaret Sullavan. During his senior year, he served as president of the Princeton Triangle Club. Before his graduation, he won a scholarship to travel to Moscow to observe the rehearsals of Konstantin Stanislavski, and Logan left school without a diploma.

Broadway
Logan began his Broadway career as an actor in Carry Nation in 1932. He was also in I Was Waiting for You (1933).

He then spent time in London, where he staged two productions and directed a touring revival of Camille. He also worked as an assistant stage manager.

Director
Back on Broadway he staged It's You I Want (1935) and To See Ourselves (1935) and was stage manager for Most of the Game (1935). He staged Hell Freezes Over (1935–36) and returned to acting with A Room in Red and White  (1936).

He went to Hollywood where he did some dialogue directing on The Garden of Allah (1936), History Is Made at Night (1937), and Suez (1938). Logan was given the chance to co-direct the feature film I Met My Love Again (1938) for Walter Wanger.

Logan returned to Broadway where he had his first major success as a director with Paul Osborn's On Borrowed Time (1938), which ran for 321 performances. He followed it with the musical I Married an Angel (1938–39), which ran for 331 performances.

He directed Knickerbocker Holiday (1938), Stars in Your Eyes (1939), Osborn's Morning's at Seven (1939–40), Two For the Show (1940), and Higher and Higher (1940, 84 performances). None of these was a break-out success but his revival of Charley's Aunt (1940–41) went for 233 performances, and the Hart-Rodgers musical By Jupiter (1942–43) with Ray Bolger went for 427 performances.

World War II
In 1942, Logan was drafted by the U.S. Army. During his service in World War II, he acted as a public-relations and intelligence officer. Logan was selected to become an assistant director of Irving Berlin's This Is the Army and when in Europe organised "jeep shows" of entertainers serving as soldiers doing their shows near the front lines.

When the war concluded he was discharged with the rank of captain, and returned to Broadway. He married his second wife, actress Nedda Harrigan, in 1945; Logan's previous marriage, to actress Barbara O'Neil, a colleague of his at the University Players in the 1930s, had ended in divorce.

Post-war success
Logan's directing career resumed with the musical Annie Get Your Gun (1946–49), which ran for 1,147 performances.

He followed it with Anita Loos' Happy Birthday (1948, 563 performances), and Norman Krasna's John Loves Mary (1948–49, 423 performances). Logan's golden run continued with Mister Roberts (1948–1951) which he co-wrote as well as directed; it ran for 1157 performances and earned him a Tony Award.

Then he directed and co-wrote South Pacific (1949–54), which went for 1,925 performances. Logan shared the 1950 Pulitzer Prize for Drama with Richard Rodgers and Oscar Hammerstein II for co-writing South Pacific. The show earned him a Tony Award for Best Director. Despite his contributions to the musical, The New York Times originally omitted his name as co-author, and the Pulitzer Prize committee initially awarded the prize to only Rodgers and Hammerstein. Although the mistakes were corrected, Logan wrote in his autobiography: "I knew then why people fight so hard to have their names in proper type. It's not just ego or 'the principle of the thing,' it's possibly another job or a better salary. It's reassurance. My name had been so minimized that I lived through years of having people praise South Pacific in my presence without knowing I had had anything to do with it."

Logan wrote, produced and directed The Wisteria Tree (1950), an adaptation of The Cherry Orchard, which was a minor success.

Logan cowrote, coproduced, and directed the 1952 musical Wish You Were Here. After the show was not initially successful, Logan quickly wrote 54 new pages of material, and by the ninth performance, the show looked new. In its fourth week of release, the show sold out, and continued to offer sell-out performances for the next two years.

He had another success with Picnic (1953–1954), the play by William Inge, which went for 477 performances. Krasna's Kind Sir (1953–54) lasted 166 performances, and Fanny (1953–1954) which Logan co-wrote, co-produced and directed, ran 888 performances.

Hollywood
When director John Ford became sick, Logan reluctantly returned to Hollywood to complete the filming of Mister Roberts (1955). It was a success commercially and critically.

Logan directed the film adaptation of his own Picnic (1955), for which Logan received an Oscar nomination. Bus Stop (1956) with Marilyn Monroe, his next movie, was another hit.

Logan returned to Broadway, directing Middle of the Night by Paddy Chayefsky, which ran 477 performances.

He visited Japan to direct Marlon Brando in Sayonara (1957), which earned him a second Oscar nomination for Best Director. He did the movie version of South Pacific (1958).

Logan went back to Broadway and directed Blue Denim (1958, 166 performances) and the hugely popular The World of Suzie Wong (1958–1960, 508 performances). He produced Epitaph for George Dillon (1958).

Logan returned to Hollywood with Tall Story (1960), which introduced Jane Fonda to movie audiences. Back on Broadway, he directed There Was a Little Girl (1960), his first theatre flop in some years, running for only 16 performances. In Hollywood he did the movie adaptation of Fanny (1961).

In 1961, he was a member of the jury at the 2nd Moscow International Film Festival.

Logan continued to alternate Broadway and Hollywood for the rest of the 1960s. He did the Broadway musicals All American (1962, 86 performances) and Mr. President (1962–1963, 265 performances), and Tiger, Tiger Burning Bright (1962–1963, 33 performances), then made the film Ensign Pulver (1964).

After Ready When You Are, C.B.! (1964–1965, 80 performances), he did the movies of Lerner and Loewe's Camelot (1967) and Paint Your Wagon (1969). Back on Broadway, he did Look to the Lilies (1970, 31 performances).

Later career
Logan's 1976 autobiography Josh: My Up-and-Down, In-and-Out Life gives a frank account of his bipolar disorder. He appeared with his wife in the 1977 nightclub revue Musical Moments, featuring Logan's most popular Broadway numbers. He published Movie Stars, Real People, and Me in 1978.

In 1979, he produced Larry Cohen's Trick on Broadway. He directed Horowitz and Mrs. Washington (1980), which ran for six performances.

From 1983 to 1986, he taught theater at Florida Atlantic University in Boca Raton, Florida. He was also responsible for bringing Carol Channing to Broadway in Lend an Ear!.

Personal life
Logan experienced mood fluctuations for many years, which in the 1970s psychiatrist Ronald R. Fieve treated with lithium, and the two appeared on TV talk shows extolling its virtues.

Logan was married briefly (1939–1940) to actress Barbara O'Neil. After the couple divorced, he was married to Nedda Harrigan from 1945 until his death from progressive supranuclear palsy (PSP) in New York City in 1988.

In 2019, Jane Fonda, who starred in Logan's 1960 film Tall Story, claimed both she and Logan were in love with lead actor Anthony Perkins at the time of filming, causing tension during an already difficult shoot.

Filmography
 I Met My Love Again (1938)
 Mr. Roberts (1955, uncredited)
 Picnic (1955)
 Bus Stop (1956)
 Sayonara (1957)
 South Pacific (1958)
 Tall Story (1960)
 Fanny (1961)
 Ensign Pulver (1964)
 Camelot (1967)
 Paint Your Wagon (1969)

Bibliography
 Logan, Joshua (1976). Josh: My Up and Down, In and Out Life. Delacorte Press, New York.
 Logan, Joshua (1978). Movie Stars, Real People, and Me. Delacorte Press, New York.

References

External links

Joshua Logan papers, 1723–1992 (bulk 1940–1980), held by the Library of Congress
 Joshua Logan correspondence and ephemera, 1920–1989, held by the Billy Rose Theatre Division,  New York Public Library for the Performing Arts

1908 births
1988 deaths
People from Texarkana, Texas
People from Mansfield, Louisiana
20th-century American memoirists
United States Army personnel of World War II
American theatre directors
Best Director Golden Globe winners
Broadway theatre directors
Broadway theatre producers
Donaldson Award winners
Writers from Shreveport, Louisiana
Princeton University alumni
Pulitzer Prize for Drama winners
Tony Award winners
People with bipolar disorder
Film directors from Texas
20th-century American dramatists and playwrights
Actors from Shreveport, Louisiana
Culver Academies alumni
Film directors from Louisiana
United States Army officers
Military personnel from Texas